Fluff is a Swedish punk rock band, formed from former members of the bands Mindless Sinner and Skinny Horse. They were formed in 1996 by Christer Göransson and Magnus Danneblad. They released one album in 1996, called Volume One. The band changed their name to Everlone, but the members stayed the same.

Volume One (1996)
 Welcome To Bartertown (2:06)
 People (1:46)
 Breakfast In America (2:00)
 Psychohead (2:50)
 Dreaming Is For Free (2:24)
 Leave Me Alone (1:57)
 My Medication (2:23)
 90% (1:59)
 I Say Hello (2:02)
 I'm In Love With Myself (3:18)
 Stupid (1:41)
 Save Me (2:07)
 Sha La La La (2:45)
 If I Was A Lunatic (2:34)
 Don't You Wanna Know Me (2:50)
 Keep Your Country Tidy (2:40)
 Checking In (3:30)
 Tears (1:59)
 So Far So Good (2:02)
 Breakfast in America (hidden track)

Members 
Lead vocals and rhythm guitar: Christer Göransson
Lead and rhythm guitar: Magnus Danneblad
Bass: Hård-Per
Drums: Tommy Johansson

Swedish punk rock groups